Federal Highway 54 (Carretera Federal 54) Fed. 54 is a free (libre) part of the federal highways corridors (los corredores carreteros federales) and connects Ciudad Mier, Tamaulipas, to Colima City.

The highway joins Fed. 15 and Fed. 80 in the southwest part of Guadalajara. For 148 km (92 mi), the Fed. 54 designation is substituted by Fed. 54D from Acatlán de Juárez, Jalisco to Ciudad Guzmán, a toll road.

Across the southern Mexican Plateau, Fed. 54 connects Zacatecas in the southwest to Monterrey in the northeast at Fed. 57.

References

054
054
Transportation in Colima
Transportation in Jalisco
Transportation in Nuevo León
Transportation in Tamaulipas